Beur (or alternatively, Rebeu) is a colloquial term, sometimes considered pejorative, in French to designate European-born people whose parents or grandparents are immigrants from the Maghreb. The equivalent term for a female beur is a beurette. The term rebeu is neither applicable to females nor does it have a female version.

Use 
The word beur was coined using verlan for the word arabe, which means Arabic or Arab in French. Since the late 1990s, many young people have used the twice-verlanised term rebeu as a synonym. This term is now the dominant term used by the younger generations (under 30). The word beurette, the female version of beur, is created by adding the -ette female suffix in French. In French many slang words are created by simply reversing the word in terms of spelling and then reading it out. Because of French grammar rules, the new word is usually completely different from the result of reversing the word phonetically. The word beurgeois is derived from a combination of the words beur and bourgeois.

The term is mostly used in French-speaking European countries ― France, Belgium, Monaco, Luxembourg and Switzerland ― as well as in the Maghreb. Due to cultural integration between such peoples across Europe, the term is now popular in other parts of Europe with a large Maghrebi community, such as the UK, Spain, the Netherlands and Italy.

Since 1992, the BEUR.FM radio station has broadcast nationwide (106.7 FM in Paris).

See also
Maghrebis
Maghrebi communities of Paris
Berbers in France
Arabs in France
Arabs in Europe
Maghrebi Jews
Pied-Noir
Demographics of France
Islam in France
Arab diaspora
Neuilly sa mère !

References

Further reading 
 Nora Barsali, François Freland and Anne-Marie Vincent (Hg.): Générations Beurs. Français à part entière. Éditions Autrement 2003
 Philippe Bernard: La crème des beurs. De l'immigration à l'intégration. Seuil 2004
 Hafid Gafaïti (Hg.): Cultures transnationales de France. Des «Beurs» aux… ? L'Harmattan 2001

On Beur Literature:
 Alec G. Hargreaves: La littérature beur: Un guide bio-bibliographique. CELFAN Edition Monographs, New Orleans 1992
 Alec G. Hargreaves: Voices from the North African Immigrant Community in France. Immigration and Identity in Beur Fiction. Berg, New York/ Oxford 1991/1997
 Michel Laronde: Autour du roman beur. Immigration et identité. L'Harmattan 1993
 Laura Reeck: Writerly Identities in Beur Fiction and Beyond. Lexington Books 2011

External links

 La Beurgeoisie The French website for successful "Beurs".

Society of France
French words and phrases
French people of Arab descent
Arabs in France
Berbers in France